Ben Pollock is a former American soccer player who played in the NPSL.

Career statistics

Club

Notes

References

Living people
American soccer players
Association football forwards
Dayton Dynamo players
Memphis Rogues players
Detroit Rockers players
Harrisburg Heat players
National Professional Soccer League (1984–2001) players
Year of birth missing (living people)